Dommeru is a village in East Godavari district of the Indian state of Andhra Pradesh. It is located in Kovvur mandal.

Demographics 

 Census of India, Dommeru had a population of 13000. The total population constitute, 6455 males and 6545 females with a sex ratio of 1014 females per 1000 males. 1208 children are in the age group of 0–6 years, with sex ratio of 1003. The average literacy rate stands at 74.78%.

References 

Villages in East Godavari district